Ponda taluka is a subdivision of the district of South Goa, Goa state, India. Its administrative headquarters is the township of Ponda.

Location
It is situated in central part of Goa. It hosts many educational institutes and manufacturing industries. The Belgaum-Panjim highway passes through this taluka.

Ponda lies in the centre of Goa. It lies in the North Goa district. Ponda taluka is known as the home for many prominent temples in Goa. The name of the taluka (sub-district) is the same as the main town or city, which is also Ponda.

Antruz Mahal
Ponda has also been known as Antruz Mahal,  which the official NIC site says is "because of the concentration of culture, music, drama and poetry also houses the temples of Lord Mangesh (Shiva), Lord Nagesh, Lord Ganapati, Lord Ramnath and the Goddesses Mhalasa and Shantdurga" It has been called the "Hindu heart of Goa".

Temples, a mosque
Ponda is famous for five important temples (including Shri Mangues and Shri Mahalsa, lying between Mardol and Priol villages) situated around the town of Ponda and within the taluka, the largest mosque in Goa.  Ponda is an important transport hub.

Capital
The capital of this subdistrict of Ponda, also called Ponda  (town or city), lies 28 km south east of the state-capital Panaji or Panjim.  It is some 17 km north-east of Margao.

History
In 1791, Ponda was taken over by the Portuguese, then ruling Goa, from the Raja of Sonda.  It was annexed to what was then Goa along with the sub-districts of Quepem, Canacona and Sanguem.  Its main town was built up during Portuguese rule, first as an administrative and court centre, and later a commercial centre.

Part of Kavle
Ponda town was earlier part of kavle village.  Lying along the Panjim-Margao inland highway the avoids the Mandovi river, it is also a link between Goa and neighbouring Karnataka state, via the Ponda-Belgaum highway (NH4A).

Ponda today
Goa College of Engineering is located in Farmaguddi village, in Ponda taluka, on the outskirts of Ponda town.  Ponda taluka serves as the gateway to Goa's wildlife sanctuaries -- Bondla and the Mahavir Wildlife Sanctuary.

List of towns, including census towns, in Ponda taluka
 Bandora (Census Town)
 Borim (Census Town)
 Candola (Census Town)
 Curti (Census Town)
 Marcaim (Census Town)
 Orgao (Census Town)
 Ponda (Municipal Council)
 Priol (Census Town)
 Quela (Census Town)
 Usgao (Census Town)

List of villages in Ponda taluka
 Adcolna 
 Betora (Bethora)
 Betqui (Betki)
 Boma
 Candepar(Khandepar)
 Codar
 Conxem
 Cuncoliem
 Cundaim (Kundaim)
 Durbhat
 Gangem
 Nirancal
 Ponchavadi (Panchvadi)
 Querim  (Keri)
 Savoi-Verem
 Siroda (Shiroda) 
 Telaulim (Talaulim)
 Tivrem
 Vadi
 Vagurbem
 Velinga (Veling)
 Volvoi

See also
Ponda, Goa

References

External links
Cities and villages in Ponda Taluk

Taluks of Goa
Geography of North Goa district